The Peru Green Party (commonly Partido Verde) and previously Green Alternative Ecologist Party of Peru is the Green party in Peru.

References

External links
 

Global Greens member parties
Green parties in South America
Political parties in Peru
Political parties with year of establishment missing